The Premier League Four-Team Championship was a contest between teams competing in the Premier League in the United Kingdom. Eight teams are grouped into fours, with one rider from each team in each race. The winners and second place of each group competed for the Championship in the final.

History
The competition replaced the National League Four-Team Championship (held from 1976 until 1994). It was first staged in 1995 when the Premier League was the highest tier of British speedway because the top two divisions had merged. However, in 1996, it reverted back to a competition for second tier teams in the British Speedway system.

In 2017, the competition changed its name to the SGB Championship Fours.

Winners

See also
 List of United Kingdom Speedway Fours Champions
 Speedway in the United Kingdom

References

Speedway competitions in the United Kingdom